Peter Cain is an Australian skater.

Peter Cain may also refer to:
 Peter Cain (artist) (1959–1997), American artist
 Peter Cain (politician), Australian politician

See also
Peter Kane (disambiguation)
Peter Du Cane (disambiguation)